The Bremen Literature Prize (literally: Literature Prize of the city of Bremen) is a German literary award. The prize money is €25,000 (Förderpreis: €6,000).

Recipients

1954 Heinrich Schmidt-Barrien for Tanzgeschichten. Ein Reigen aus dem Leben
1955 Ilse Aichinger for Der Gefesselte. Erzählungen, Herbert Meier for Die Barke von Gawdos. Stück in 3 Akten
1956 Ernst Jünger for Am Sarazenenturm
1957 Ingeborg Bachmann for Anrufung des großen Bären, Gerd Oelschlegel for Romeo und Julia in Berlin
1958 Paul Celan for Mohn und Gedächtnis och Von Schwelle zu Schwelle
1959 Rolf Schroers for In fremder Sache
1960 not awarded
1961 not awarded
1962 Siegfried Lenz for Zeit der Schuldlosen
1963 Herbert Heckmann for Benjamin und seine Väter
1964 Christa Reinig for Gedichte
1965 Thomas Bernhard for Frost
1966 Wolfgang Hildesheimer for Tynset
1967 Hans Günter Michelsen for Helm
1968 Helga M. Novak for Colloquium mit vier Häuten
1969 Horst Bienek for Die Zelle
1970 Christian Enzensberger for Größerer Versuch über den Schmutz
1971 Gabriele Wohmann for Ernste Absicht
1972 Jürg Acklin for Alias
1973 Günter Herburger for Die Eroberung der Zitadelle
1974 Jurek Becker for Irreführung der Behörden
1975 Franz Innerhofer for Schöne Tage
1976 Paul Nizon for Stolz
1977 Nicolas Born for Die erdabgewandte Seite der Geschichte, Heinar Kipphardt for März, Förderpreis Karin Kiwus for Von beiden Seiten der Gegenwart
1978 Christa Wolf for Kindheitsmuster, Förderpreis Maria Erlenberger for Der Hunger nach Wahnsinn
1979 Alexander Kluge for Neue Geschichten. Hefte 1-18, Unheimlichkeit der Zeit, Förderpreis Uwe Timm for Morenga
1980 Peter Rühmkorf for Haltbar bis Ende 1999, Förderpreis Peter-Paul Zahl for Die Glücklichen
1981 Christoph Meckel for Suchbild. Über meinen Vater och Säure, Förderpreis Werner Kofler for Aus der Wildnis. Zwei Fragmente
1982 Peter Weiss for Die Ästhetik des Widerstands, Förderpreis Franz Böni for Die Wanderarbeiter
1983 Erich Fried for Das Nahe suchen, Förderpreis Clemens Mettler for Gleich einem Standbild, so unbewegt
1984 Paul Wühr for Das falsche Buch, Förderpreis Bodo Morshäuser for Die Berliner Simulation
1985 Rolf Haufs for Juniabend, Förderpreis Herta Müller for Niederungen
1986 Volker Braun for Hinze-Kunze-Roman, Förderpreis Eva Schmidt for Ein Vergleich mit dem Leben
1987 Jürgen Becker for Odenthals Küste, Förderpreis Daniel Grolle for Keinen Schritt weiter
1988 Peter Handke for Nachmittag eines Schriftstellers & Die Abwesenheit, Förderpreis Evelyn Schlag for Die Kränkung
1989 Ingomar von Kieseritzky for Das Buch der Desaster, Förderpreis Norbert Gstrein for Einer
1990 Wilhelm Genazino for Der Fleck, die Jacke, die Zimmer, der Schmerz, Förderpreis Irina Liebmann for Mitten im Krieg
1991 Fritz Rudolf Fries for Die Väter im Kino, Förderpreis Thomas Strittmatter for Raabe Baikal
1992 Ror Wolf for Nachrichten aus der bewohnten Welt, Förderpreis Durs Grünbein for Schädelbasislektion
1993 Georges-Arthur Goldschmidt for Der unterbrochene Wald, Förderpreis Hans-Ulrich Treichel for Von Leib und Seele
1994 Wolfgang Hilbig for Ich, Förderpreis Peter Weber for Der Wettermacher
1995 Reinhard Lettau for Flucht vor Gästen, Förderpreis Marion Titze for Unbekannter Verlust
1996 Elfriede Jelinek for Die Kinder der Toten, Förderpreis Jens Sparschuh for Der Zimmerspringbrunnen. Ein Heimatroman
1997 Michael Roes for Rub' al-Khali – Leeres Viertel. Invention über das Spiel, Förderpreis Stefanie Menzinger for Wanderungen im Inneren des Häftlings
1998 Einar Schleef for Droge Faust Parsifal, Förderpreis Brigitte Oleschinski for Your passport is not guilty
1999 Dieter Forte for In der Erinnerung, Förderpreis Judith Hermann for Sommerhaus, später
2000 Adolf Endler for Der Pudding der Apokalypse; Förderpreis Christa Estenfeld for Menschenfresserin
2001 Alexander Kluge for Chronik der Gefühle; Förderpreis Raphael Urweider for Lichter in Menlo Park
2002 W.G. Sebald postumt for Austerlitz; Förderpreis Juli Zeh for Adler und Engel
2003 Ulrich Peltzer for Bryant Park; Förderpreis Andreas Schäfer for Auf dem Weg nach Messara
2004 Lutz Seiler for vierzig kilometer nacht; Förderpreis Jörg Matheis for Mono
2005 Brigitte Kronauer for Verlangen nach Musik und Gebirge; Förderpreis Antje Rávic Strubel for Tupolew 134
2006 Reinhard Jirgl for Abtrünnig; Förderpreis Svenja Leiber for Büchsenlicht
2007 Felicitas Hoppe for Johanna; Förderpreis Saša Stanišić for Wie der Soldat das Grammofon repariert
2008 Hans Joachim Schädlich for Vorbei; Förderpreis Thomas Melle for Raumforderung
2009 Martin Kluger for Der Vogel, der spazieren geht; Förderpreis Mathias Gatza for Der Schatten der Tiere
2010 Clemens J. Setz for Die Frequenzen; Förderpreis Roman Graf for Herr Blanc
2011 Friederike Mayröcker for ich bin in der Anstalt. Fusznoten zu einem nichtgeschriebenen Werk; Förderpreis Andrea Grill for Das Schöne und das Notwendige
2012 Marlene Streeruwitz for Die Schmerzmacherin; Förderpreis Joachim Meyerhoff for Alle Toten fliegen hoch. Amerika
2013 Wolf Haas for Verteidigung der Missionarsstellung; Förderpreis Andreas Stichmann for Das große Leuchten
2014 Clemens Meyer for Im Stein; Förderpreis Roman Ehrlich for Das kalte Jahr
2015 Marcel Beyer for Graphit; Förderpreis Nadja Küchenmeister for Unter dem Wacholder
2016 Henning Ahrens for Glantz und Gloria; Förderpreis Matthias Nawrat for Die vielen Tode unseres Opas Jurek
2017 Terézia Mora for Die Liebe unter Aliens; Förderpreis Senthuran Varatharajah for Vor der Zunahme der Zeichen
2018 Thomas Lehr for Schlafende Sonne; Förderpreis Laura Freudenthaler for Die Königin schweigt
2019 Arno Geiger for Unter der Drachenwand; Förderpreis Heinz Helle for Die Überwindung der Schwerkraft
2020 Barbara Honigmann for Georg; Förderpreis Tonio Schachinger for Nicht wie ihr
2021 Marion Poschmann for Nimbus; Förderpreis Jana Volkmann for Auwald
2022 Judith Hermann for Daheim; Förderpreis Matthias Senkel for Winkel der Welt
2023 Thomas Stangl for Quecksilberlicht;

References

External links
 

German literary awards